Colaneri is an Italian surname. Notable people with the surname include:

Joseph Colaneri, American conductor
Lelio Colaneri (1917–?), Italian footballer

Italian-language surnames